Shokouh Riazi (1921–1962) was an Iranian Modernist painter, and educator. She a pioneer of modern art in Iran and is thought to have been the first Iranian women to study art in Paris. Riazi taught painting classes, and some members of the Saqqakhaneh movement had been her students.

Biography 

Shokouh Riazi was born in 1921 in Tehran, Qajar Iran, into a prosperous family. Her mother was Betul Dolatshahi of the noble Dolatshahi family of Persia, and was the daughter of Qajar prince and Islamic philosopher . Because of her father's work she lived in Paris until age 14, after which her family moved to Shiraz. She was fluent in French; and she served as a translator between French and Persian languages.

Riazi initially entered university studying medicine at Tehran University (now University of Tehran), but never completed that degree program. Instead Riazi switched departments and studied in the Faculty of Fine Arts at Tehran University, where she graduated in 1946; and later at Beaux-Arts de Paris. Her classmate was artist Javad Hamidi, in both Tehran and Paris. She continued her studies of painting under André Lhote in Paris. 

She was influenced by the work of Amedeo Modigliani, and the elongated female portraits.

Riazi taught portraiture class in the College of Decorative Arts at Tehran University (now University of Tehran). Many of her art students were members of the later Saqqakhaneh movement, including Charles Hossein Zenderoudi, Faramarz Pilaram, Mansoor Ghandriz, and Massoud Arabshahi.

She died of cancer in 1962 in Tehran. Due of her premature death, there is a limited amount of her artwork. Riazi's work can be found in the museum collection at Tehran Museum of Contemporary Art.

See also 

 List of Iranian women artists

References

External links 

1921 births
1962 deaths
Iranian women painters
Artists from Tehran
20th-century Iranian women artists
Iranian emigrants to France
University of Tehran alumni
École des Beaux-Arts alumni
Academic staff of the University of Tehran
Deaths from cancer in Iran